The Left Was Never Right was a book published in June 1945 by Quintin Hogg, the Conservative MP for Oxford, which examined the speeches and policies of politicians from the Labour Party and the Liberal Party concerning armaments and appeasement. These were contrasted to quotes by Conservative MPs such as Winston Churchill and Sir Austen Chamberlain supporting British rearmament and against appeasement of Germany. The books dust-jacket quoted Jesus' remark: "Out of thine own mouth will I judge thee" from Luke 19:22.

Hogg stated that the Gollancz books were "morally wicked, unpatriotic and factually incorrect. The Left Was Never Right was an attempt to set the record straight and to establish that unpreparedness before the war was largely the consequence of the policies of the parties of the Left". It was the only book published which specifically countered Gollancz publications such as Guilty Men. In his memoirs, Hogg wrote that although the book was "a success ... it was too little too late to counteract the impression made by the earlier Gollancz publications".

Notes

References
Lord Hailsham, A Sparrow's Flight (London: Collins, 1990).

1945 non-fiction books
Books about politics of the United Kingdom 
Books about World War II
1945 in British politics
1945 in the United Kingdom
Faber and Faber books